Johannes Karl von und zu Franckenstein (1610–1691) was the Prince-Bishop of Worms from 1683 to 1691.

Biography

A member of the House of Franckenstein, Johannes Karl von und zu Franckenstein was born in Castle Frankenstein in 1610.  

On 17 August 1683, the cathedral chapter of Worms Cathedral elected him to be the new Prince-Bishop of Worms. Pope Innocent XI confirmed his appointment on 16 July 1688 and he was consecrated as a bishop by Anselm Franz von Ingelheim, Archbishop-Elector of Mainz, on 5 September 1688.

He died on 29 September 1691 and is buried in Frankfurt Cathedral.

References

1610 births
1691 deaths
Roman Catholic bishops of Worms